The ACM SIGOPS (Special Interest Group on Operating Systems) Mark Weiser Award is awarded to an individual who has shown creativity and innovation in operating system research. The recipients began their career no earlier than 20 years prior to nomination. The special-interest-group-level award was created in 2001 and is named after Mark Weiser, the father of ubiquitous computing.

The winners of this award have been:
 2022: David Andersen, Carnegie Melon University
 2021: Michael J. Freedman, Princeton University
 2020: Jason Flinn, University of Michigan and Facebook
 2019: Ion Stoica, UC Berkeley
 2018: Andrea Arpaci-Dusseau and Remzi Arpaci-Dusseau, University of Wisconsin-Madison
 2017: Nickolai Zeldovich, MIT
 2016: Antony Rowstron, Microsoft Research (Cambridge)
 2015: Yuanyuan Zhou, UCSD
 2014: Eddie Kohler, Harvard University
 2013: Stefan Savage, UCSD
 2012: Jeff Dean and Sanjay Ghemawat, Google
 2011: Miguel Castro, Microsoft Research
 2010: Robert Tappan Morris, MIT
 2009: Eric Brewer, UC Berkeley/Google
 2008: Peter Druschel, MPI
 2007: Peter M. Chen, University of Michigan
 2006: Dawson Engler, Stanford University
 2005: Thomas E. Anderson, University of Washington
 2004: Brian N. Bershad, University of Washington and Google
 2003: Mike Burrows, Google
 2002: Mendel Rosenblum, Stanford University
 2001: Frans Kaashoek, MIT

See also
 List of computer science awards
 List of prizes named after people

References

American science and technology awards
Computer science awards
Awards established in 2001